William John Koski (February 6, 1932 – July 12, 2014) was an American pitcher in Major League Baseball who played for the Pittsburgh Pirates. Listed at 6' 4" (1.93 m), 185 lb. (84 kg), he batted and threw right handed.

Born in Madera, California, Koski was one of the many promising young players whose career was interrupted by army service in Korean War. He starred at Modesto High School and, at age 19, pitched in 13 games for the Pirates during the 1951 season. His statistics were what you would expect from a very young pitcher relying primarily on his blazing fastball. He posted a 0-1 record and a 6.67 earned run average, allowing 23 runs (20 earned) on 26 hits and 28 walks, while striking out seven in 27.0 innings of work.

In his only starting assignment, Koski lasted 4⅓ innings against the New York Giants at Polo Grounds, giving up three earned runs on four hits and six walks, striking out two of the 23 batters he faced. The Giants won, 8–3, as he was credited with the loss.

′′T-Bone′′, as he was nicknamed, started 1952 back in the Minor Leagues, but his stuff impressed Pirates' owner Branch Rickey so much that the visionary executive tried to recall Koski to the big club early in August. Unfortunately, Koski had been drafted into the Army and needed to report for duty on August 21.

Following his discharge in 1954, Koski returned to the minors and pitched until 1957. In a seven-season career, he had a record of 39-48 with a 4.14 ERA in 138 pitching appearances.

After retiring, Koski moved to Modesto, California, where he worked as a draftsman for the Stanislaus County Planning Department. Besides, he stayed involved in amateur baseball as a coach in youth leagues and as the pitching coach at California State University, Stanislaus.

Koski died in 2014 at the age of 82.

Sources

Further reading
Dennis Snelling: A Glimpse of Fame, McFarland & Company, Jefferson N.C., 1993, pp. 5–18

1932 births
2014 deaths
Baseball players from California
Brunswick Pirates players
Burlington-Graham Pirates players
Kinston Eagles players
Las Vegas Wranglers players
Major League Baseball pitchers
Mayfield Clothiers players
United States Army personnel of the Korean War
Modesto Reds players
New Orleans Pelicans (baseball) players
People from Madera, California
People from Modesto, California
Pittsburgh Pirates players
St. Jean Canadians players